Grinăuți-Moldova is a commune in Ocnița District, Moldova. It is composed of three villages: Grinăuți-Moldova, Grinăuți-Raia and Rediul Mare station.

Notable people
 Marcel Răducan

References

Communes of Ocnița District